Southend is a small residential locality in the London Borough of Lewisham in southeast London, England. It was historically a rural village at the south of the parish of Lewisham, Kent that remained undeveloped until after the First World War. It is now a residential suburb, with some large retail stores, within the built-up area of London.

History
The name is derived from 'the south end of the parish of Lewisham'.

Southend, Lewisham became part of the Lewisham District in the metropolitan area of London in 1855. However, the village of Southend was separated from the urban development in the north by a swathe of farmland.

Geography
Bordering Bellingham, Downham, Sydenham and Beckenham the area isn't often called Southend, more commonly being known as a part of Bellingham. The area is also part of the SE6 postcode district associated with Catford.

Transport
Both stations are served by Southeastern. 
For London Buses, routes 181 and 352 serve the area.

References

Districts of the London Borough of Lewisham
Areas of London